Kælan Mikla is an Icelandic post-punk band, formed in 2013 in Reykjavík. The trio consists of Laufey Soffía (lead vocals), Margrét Rósa Dóru-Harrýsdóttir (bass) and Sólveig Matthildur Kristjánsdóttir (synthesizer). Their music has been described as post-punk, dark wave, cold wave and gothic.

The band's debut album Mánadans was recorded in 2014 and featured Matthildur on drums instead of synthesizer. They released a self-titled follow-up in 2016, Nótt eftir nótt in 2018 and Undir kö​ldum nor​ð​urljósum in 2021. They are currently signed to Artoffact Records.

The band has played the famous Dutch music festival Roadburn, been championed by Robert Smith of the Cure and opened for Placebo and Alcest.

History 
Kælan Mikla formed in 2013 as an entry for a local poetry contest hosted by the Reykjavík City Library, combining Matthildur's written poems with Rósa's bass and Soffía's vocals. Matthildur was a trained flutist who learned drums for the performance, while Soffía had never sang in public before. The group won first place at the poetry slam and encouraged by the reception, decided to continue making music. The band took their name from a character in Moomins, a comic strip by Finnish cartoonist Tove Jansson. The members met while attending Menntaskólinn við Hamrahlíð, a school geared towards artistically-oriented students.

The band's debut album Mánadans was recorded in 2014 and was produced by Alison MacNeil of the band Kimono. It saw release via limited edition cassette in 2017 and was re-released in 2018 on Artoffact with a bonus track. In 2015, Matthildur switched from playing drums to the synthesizer. That December, the band signed to Fabrika Records and released their self-titled second album on 30 June 2016.

After years of booking their own tours, Kælan Mikla was added to agency Swamp Booking's roster by recommendation of Drab Majesty, who the band opened for in 2017 and 2018. Robert Smith asked Kælan Mikla to perform at the 2018 Meltdown festival in London, whose lineup Smith personally curated for the Cure's 40th anniversary. The group opened for Placebo at the Southbank Centre. The band also performed at Roadburn Festival for the first time in 2018.

The band's third album Nótt eftir nótt ("Night After Night") was released on 9 November 2018 and "contains songs of regrets, shadows, witches and all the things that lure in the darkest hour of night, mixed with Icelandic folklore and reminiscence of the winter darkness that simultaneously frightens us and makes us feel at home," Matthildur said. Its lead single was "Nornalagið", released in October, and the band performed a release show at the Iceland Airwaves festival. The second single "Næturblóm" was praised by Revolver and Louder Audio. It was released on Artoffact as the band began business with the label because of their debut's re-release. 

In 2019, the band was again selected by Robert Smith to play his Pasadena Daydream festival in California alongside bands such as Pixies, Deftones and Mogwai.

On 6 April 2021, the band released "Sólstöður", the lead single to their fourth album Undir köldum norðurljósum ("Under the Cold Northern Lights"). The song is "an ode to the darkest night of the year, when witches summon winter spirits in the frozen vastness of Icelandic landscapes." Second single "Ósýnileg" was premiered by Adult Swim on 2 June. The album was released on 15 October 2021 and features Alcest, who the band opened for in 2020, on the song "Hvítir sandar".

Musical style and lyrics 
Kælan Mikla's music is often described as post-punk, dark wave, cold wave and gothic. Revolver described their sound as containing "sweeping eerie soundscapes, irresistible post-punk hooks and dance beats couple with angelic voices and blood-curdling shrieks." The band's sound draws from the darkness and cold of its native Iceland. Icelandic nature, history, folklore and mythology play a role in Kælan Mikla's music. Its members all identify as feminists, which inspires their heavy use of witchcraft imagery.

Band members 
Current members

 Laufey Soffía (lead vocals)
 Margrét Rósa (bass)
 Sólveig Matthildur (synthesizer)

Discography 

 Mánadans (2014)
 Kælan Mikla (2016)
 Nótt eftir nótt (2018)
 Undir köldum norðurljósum (2021)

References 

Icelandic post-punk music groups
Musical groups established in 2013
Musical groups from Reykjavík